Brett Morse (born 11 February 1989) is a British athlete who competes in the discus throw.

Career
Born in Penarth, Vale of Glamorgan, Wales, He is a member of the Birchfield Harriers club and is currently coached by Andy Brittan. He was previously coached by Vésteinn Hafsteinsson. This caused controversy due to Icelandic Haffesteinson's two-year ban from competition after a failed drug test for nandralone at the 1984 Summer Olympics.  Morse has a degree in sports management from the University of Wales Institute Cardiff.

Morse won the gold medal at the 2010 UK Championships, becoming the first Welshman to win the discus title. He competed for Wales at the 2010 Commonwealth Games in Delhi, India, where he finished in sixth position. At the 2011 World Championships, held in Daegu, South Korea, he advanced to the final where he finished in 12th place.

Morse represented Great Britain and Northern Ireland at the 2012 European Athletics Championships in Helsinki, Finland, but failed to reach the discus final. The result meant that Okoye secured automatic selection for the 2012 Olympics but Morse was still 65 centimetres short of the 'A' qualification standard needed to guarantee his place.

In July 2012 Morse was confirmed as part of the Great Britain team for the 2012 Summer Olympics in the men's discus alongside compatriots Lawrence Okoye and Abdul Buhari. The event was held at the Olympic Stadium on 6–7 August.

The 2013 season saw Brett join up with at the time Welsh Athletics throwing coach, Andy Brittan. During the season Brett extended his own Welsh discus record to 66.84m, and won the British Athletics Championships held at Birmingham. He was invited to the London Grand Prix (Anniversary Games 2013 ) in London's Olympic Stadium,  where he finished sixth in a world class field, narrowly missing out on fifth place by 4 cm. Brett was also selected by Great Britain and Northern Ireland for the 2013 World Athletics Championship in Moscow. He finished the 2013 season 8th in the list of the World Best throws for that year, one of only four British athletes to make the top ten in their respective disciplines.

During 2014 Morse parted company with his coach, and was still nursing a disc injury in his back which he first felt at the 2013 World championships whilst warming up for the qualification round. Despite this, in August of that year Brett was select to represent Wales in the Commonwealth Games held at Glasgow. He achieved 5th place with a throw of 60.84m, 3.16m behind the gold medal throw produced by USA based Vikas Gowda.

This season Morse has gone back to basics and appointed a new coach, Nigel Bevan, who coached him previously (pre-2012), during a very successful period. While throwing in the Loughborough International in May, his opening competition of the season, he achieved a distance of 63.42m, greater than all of his throws of the previous season.

References

Living people
1989 births
Sportspeople from Penarth
British male discus throwers
Welsh male discus throwers
Olympic athletes of Great Britain
Athletes (track and field) at the 2012 Summer Olympics
Commonwealth Games competitors for Wales
Athletes (track and field) at the 2010 Commonwealth Games
Athletes (track and field) at the 2014 Commonwealth Games
World Athletics Championships athletes for Great Britain
Alumni of Cardiff Metropolitan University